The 1873 CCNY Lavender football team represented the City College of New York in the 1873 college football season.

Schedule

References

CCNY
CCNY Beavers football seasons
College football winless seasons
CCNY Lavender football